By the Fire is the sixth solo album by Thurston Moore.

Moore claimed the album and its release were a political act saying "I put out By the Fire as a political move. Any time you put out a record, a book, a fanzine, a blog, a cassette, a CD, whatever you're doing, that's a political move. You're actually engaging in a social world. I called it By the Fire because of that. [It's] the idea of people sitting around a fire and dialoguing."

Reception

Ron Hart of Spin called the album "his most direct solo outing since his 1995 debut, Psychic Hearts." Stuart Berman of Pitchfork praised the album and said of the almost 90 minutes length of the album "it's a record that justifies and even demands the extra space to explore."

Daniel Sylvester of Exclaim! was less effusive calling the album "boring and tedious" and said of it "much of the material sounds like Sonic Youth, even if the quality isn't there."

Track listing

Personnel
 Thurston Moore – vocals, guitars
 James Sedwards – guitars
 Debbie Googe – bass guitars
 Steve Shelley – drums

References 

2020 albums
Thurston Moore albums